Kochnegovskaya is a rural locality (a village) in Nikolskoye Rural Settlement of Vilegodsky District, Arkhangelsk Oblast, Russia. The population was 11 as of 2010.

Geography 
Kochnegovskaya is located 27 km northwest of Ilyinsko-Podomskoye (the district's administrative centre) by road. Koltas is the nearest rural locality.

References 

Rural localities in Vilegodsky District